Thomas Paine (1737–1809) was an English-American political activist, philosopher, political theorist, and revolutionary

Thomas Paine may also refer to:
Thomas O. Paine (1921–1992), American scientist and NASA administrator
Thomas Paine (privateer) (1632–1715), colonial American privateer
John Kricfalusi, who took Thomas Paine as his pen name when writing for Film Threat and Wild Cartoon Kingdom

See also
Thomas Payne (disambiguation)